The Market is a New Zealand drama series set in South Auckland's Otara Markets.  The show is centered on two families, one Māori (the Johnsons) and one Samoan (the Limas).

Cast
Joe Naufahu - Sef Lima
Xavier Horan - Mike Johnson
Alina Transom - Julie Lima
Taungaroa Emile - Tipene Johnson
Pete Smith - Chris Johnson
Cherie James - Ngarie Johnson
Dave Fane

Crew
Rene Naufahu (writer/director)
Brett Ihaka (writer)
Matthew Grainger (writer)
Damon Fepulea'i (director)
Geoff Cawthorn (director)

References

External links
Internet Movie Database

2005 New Zealand television series debuts
New Zealand drama television series
TVNZ original programming
Television shows funded by NZ on Air
Television shows set in Auckland